Tuam Celtic A.F.C. is an Irish association football club based in Tuam, County Galway. Their senior men's currently competes in the Galway & District League. The club also operates a ladies team a number of schoolboy teams.

History
The demise of Tuam Town F.C. in 1973, led a group of players who played at the old racecourse in Parkmore, to convene a meeting with the idea of forming a new club.

A meeting was held in Tuam C.B.S (now St. Patrick's College) on Monday 18 February 1974 to found a new club. Initially a fee of 25 pence was set for membership cards to be sold to players and supporters. Registered players had to pay £1 with a fee of 10 pence per week.

During a meeting held on 1 October 1975, it was proposed that a Board of Trustees would be formed and each would invest £1000 over two years in the Tuam Celtic Development Fund. Grounds were eventually purchased at Cloonthue Road, Tuam which is now the club's permanent home.

In 1996, the club added floodlights and built dressing rooms at Cloonthue. The grounds, training pitches and facilities are wholly owned by the club, a testament to many years of voluntary fund raising by club members.

In 2010 Tuam Celtic seniors won the Jack Lillis Cup with a 3 - 1 win over OLBC. The following season Tuam Celtic finished second in Division 2 league and gained promotion to Division One.

In 2013 Tuam Celtic were promoted to the Premier League of the Galway & District League for the first time since 1991 after a hugely successful season where they finished 2nd in Division one. Celtic were just pipped to top spot on the final day of the season by St Pats.

References

Association football clubs established in 1974
Association football clubs in County Galway
Galway & District League teams
Sport in Tuam
1974 establishments in Ireland
Connacht Senior League (association football) clubs